Ashyan Rural District is a rural district (dehestan) in Central District, Lenjan County, Isfahan Province, Iran. At the 2006 census, its population was 4576, in 1189 families.

References 

Rural Districts of Isfahan Province
Lenjan County